Esmé Patterson is an American musician from Denver, Colorado. She is a former member of the indie folk band Paper Bird.

Career
Patterson began her career in the band Paper Bird.  In 2012, Patterson began her solo career, releasing her first full-length album titled All Princes, I. In 2015, Patterson released her second full-length album titled Woman to Woman. In 2016, Patterson released her third full-length album titled We Were Wild. In late 2016, Patterson released a split 7-inch with William Elliott Whitmore. Patterson released her latest record in 2020 titled There Will Come Soft Rains.

Discography
Studio albums
All Princes, I (2012)
Woman to Woman (2015)
We Were Wild (2016)
There Will Come Soft Rains (2020)

References

Living people
American women singer-songwriters
Musicians from Denver
Year of birth missing (living people)
21st-century American women
Singer-songwriters from Colorado